Torņakalns–Tukums II Railway is a  long,  gauge railway in Latvia, built in the 19th century to connect Riga and Tukums.

References 

Railway lines in Latvia
Transport in Riga
Tukums
5 ft gauge railways in Latvia
Railway lines opened in 1877
19th-century establishments in Latvia
1877 establishments in the Russian Empire